Global China Connection or GCC (Mandarin Chinese: 全球中国联接) is a student-run 501(c)3 nonprofit organization created for university students and young professionals of all nationalities to encourage China's emergence in the world in a nonpolitical environment. GCC connects future leaders from all nations and assists them in developing the skills and friendships necessary to succeed both in China and internationally. GCC is present in more than 60 top universities in North America, Asia, Europe, and Oceania, including Harvard University, Yale University, Princeton University, University of Pennsylvania, New York University, Columbia University, and Cornell University. With its geographic reach, GCC connects thousands of students, recent graduates, and professionals that are interested in China. Every year, GCC hosts hundreds of local, regional, national, and international events. GCC's main activities include hosting delegations of university students, China-focused social and professional events, and annual summits in China and the United States. The official languages of GCC are English and Mandarin Chinese. Global China Connection was founded in 2008 at Columbia University with a motto "Building relationships that will change the world".

Organization
GCC's structure is divided into GCC Central Management and Chapter Network. GCC Central Management manages overall communication and strategic activities. It also directs the network and coordinates most of the organization's larger international events. The Chapter Network consists of individual GCC university chapters. Their own presidents and executive boards govern each chapter.

At the top level, GCC is governed by a board of trustees (highly distinguished GCC members) and senior advisers (highly distinguished individuals outside of GCC).

Events
GCC events connect companies, social organizations, and aspiring individuals through annual conferences as well as smaller-scale forums. The organization hosts two major conferences each year, generally in New York City (spring) and Beijing (summer). Conferences contain discussion on subjects such as politics, economics, international relations, business, journalism, and culture related to China. Smaller conferences and events are also hosted by chapters within GCC.

Previous speakers at GCC conferences include:
Kevin Rudd, former Prime Minister of Australia
Cui Tiankai, Chinese Ambassador to the United States
Steve Forbes, president and CEO, Forbes Inc.
Stephen Roach, chairman of Morgan Stanley Asia and chief economist at Morgan Stanley
Orville Schell, director of the Asia Society's Center on U.S. China-Relations
Susan Shirk, former U.S. Deputy Assistant Secretary of State
Jin Zhijian, Consul General of the Chinese Consulate in Christchurch
Kirsten Gillibrand, U.S. Senator from New York
Joseph Stiglitz, Nobel Prize-winning economist and Columbia University professor
Zhang Weiying, Dean of Guanghua School of Management at Peking University
Bai Yansong, CCTV anchor
Liu Xiao Ling Tong prominent actor in China best known for his role as the Monkey King in Journey to the West (1986 TV series)

The smaller forums are based on subjects such as China's sustainable development/environmental protection challenges; the stimulus packages passed by China and the U.S.; the current state of the American media; U.S.-China relations; and China's developing capital markets.

Delegations
GCC hosts and leads numerous student delegations in both the United States and China. GCC generally collaborates with partners such as the United Front Work Department's Western Returned Scholars Association, the Students International Communication Association of Peking University (SICA), as well as student government groups, in managing these events. GCC delegations have visited companies such as J.P. Morgan Chase, Ernst & Young, Pricewaterhouse Coopers, Microsoft, The New York Times, Baidu, and Lenovo.

Partners
Global China Connection's partners include:

Cheung Kong Graduate School of Business
Student Unions of Tsinghua University and Peking University (PKU)
Western Returned Scholars Association (欧美同学会) - *Center for China and Globalization (中国与全球化研究中心).
Ascend Leadership
Students’ International Communication Association at Peking University (SICA). GCC received SICA during their visits to New York in 2009 and 2010. SICA also helped host GCC's July 2010 conference at PKU.
Chinese Business Lawyers Association
Shanghai Youth League (上海市青年联合会)

References

External links
Global China Connection Home

International cultural organizations
 Non-profit organizations based in Washington, D.C.